The 2018–19 Saint Joseph's Hawks women's basketball team represents the Saint Joseph's University during the 2018–19 NCAA Division I women's basketball season. The Hawks, led by eighteenth year head coach Cindy Griffin, play their home games at Hagan Arena and were members of the Atlantic 10 Conference. They finished the season 12–19, 7–9 in A-10 play to finish in a 3-way tie for eighth place. They advanced to the quarterfinals of the A-10 women's tournament where they lost VCU.

Media
All non-televised Hawks home games air on the A-10 Digital Network. All Hawks games are streamed via the Saint Joseph's Sports Network on sjuhawks.com.

Roster

Schedule

|-
!colspan=9 style=| Non-conference regular season

|-
!colspan=9 style=| Atlantic 10 regular season

|-
!colspan=9 style=| Atlantic 10 Women's Tournament

Rankings
2018–19 NCAA Division I women's basketball rankings

See also
 2018–19 Saint Joseph's Hawks men's basketball team

References

Saint Joseph's Hawks women's basketball seasons
Saint Josephs
Saint Joseph's
Saint Joseph's